Tra te e il mare (English: "Between You and the Sea") is the sixth studio album by Italian singer Laura Pausini. It was released in Italy on 15 September 2000 by CGD East West Records. As of January 2001, the album sold 400,000 copies in Italy, peaking at number 2 on the Italian Albums Chart.

The Spanish-language version of the album, titled Entre tú y mil mares, was released for the hispanophone market on 11 September 2000. It was nominated for Best Female Pop Vocal Album and Best Engineered Album at the 2nd Latin Grammy Awards, while its producers were nominated for Producer of the Year.

The album has sold 4,000,000 copies worldwide.

In late 2011, a 30-second snippet of a song named "Sonambula" was leaked online, attributed to Pausini. After a controversy alleging that the song was from Pausini's then-upcoming album Inedito, Pausini confirmed that "Sonambula" was an unreleased demo from Entre tú y mil mares.

The track "Per Vivere" was written by Pausini after she went to Rio de Janeiro in early 1997 and saw many children on the street. Since the same year, Pausini makes money donations to the Romão de Matos Duarte institution.

Track listing

Tra te e il mare

Entre tú y mil mares

Charts

Weekly charts

Year-end charts

Certifications and sales

References

Other sources
 "Song Search". Warner Chappell Music (Italy). Accessed 24 August 2007.

2000 albums
Laura Pausini albums
Spanish-language albums
Italian-language albums
Compagnia Generale del Disco albums